is a passenger railway station in the town of Kudoyama, Ito District, Wakayama Prefecture, Japan, operated by the private railway company Nankai Electric Railway.

Lines
Kami-Kosawa Station is served by the Nankai Kōya Line, and is located 57.6 kilometers from the terminus of the line at Shiomibashi Station and 56.9 kilometers from Namba Station.

Station layout
The station consists of two opposed side platforms connected to the station building by a level crossing; however, due to a landslide and damaged caused by a typhoon in 2017, one of the platforms is no longer in use and the tracks have been removed. The station is unattended.

Platforms

Adjacent stations

History
Kami-Kosawa Station opened on June 18, 1928. The Nankai Railway was merged into the Kintetsu group in 1944 by orders of the Japanese government, and reemerged as the Nankai Railway Company in 1947.

Passenger statistics
In fiscal 2019, the station was used by an average of 14 passengers daily (boarding passengers only).

Surrounding area
 Japan National Route 370

See also
List of railway stations in Japan

References

External links

 Kami-Kosawa Station Official Site

Railway stations in Japan opened in 1928
Railway stations in Wakayama Prefecture
Kudoyama, Wakayama